Three ships of the United States Navy have been named USS Wadsworth, in honor of Commodore Alexander S. Wadsworth:

 The first  was a  launched in 1915 and struck in 1936.
 The second  was a  launched in 1943 and served during the final years of World War II. She was transferred to West Germany and renamed Z-3 in 1959. She was transferred to Greece in 1980 and renamed Nearchos; she was stricken in 1991.
She was transferred to Poland and renamed  in 2002.

United States Navy ship names